Put on by Cunning is a novel by British crime-writer Ruth Rendell. It was first published in 1981, and features her popular series protagonist Inspector Wexford. It is the 11th in the series.

The title comes from a quotation from Shakespeare's Hamlet, Act V Scene II:

"How these things came about: so shall you hear Of carnal, bloody, and unnatural acts,   Of accidental judgments, casual slaughters; of deaths put on by cunning and forced cause, And, in this upshot, purposes mistook Fall'n on the inventors' heads: all this can I Truly deliver".

In the US, the novel was published under the title Death Notes.

1981 British novels
Novels by Ruth Rendell
Hutchinson (publisher) books
Inspector Wexford series